Hustlers Convention is an album recorded by Jalal Mansur Nuriddin under the pseudonym Lightnin' Rod. The album was a major influence on hip hop music and combined poetry, funk, jazz and spoken word. Hustlers Convention helped add a sociopolitical element to black music. The album narrates the story of two fictional hustlers, named Sport and Spoon.

Track listing

External links
Hustlers Convention: rap's great lost album

References

1973 albums
History of hip hop
Hip hop albums by American artists
Celluloid Records albums